Maggi Kvestad (10 February 1921 – 24 November 2004) was a Norwegian speed skater. She won a bronze medal at the World Allround Speed Skating Championships for Women in 1947, behind Verné Lesche and Else Marie Christiansen. She competed at the 1949 World Championships, where she placed 14th.

She won a silver medal at the national allround championships in 1949, behind Randi Thorvaldsen, and a bronze medal in 1946.

References

External links 
 

1921 births
2004 deaths
Norwegian female speed skaters
World Allround Speed Skating Championships medalists